AC Hotel/Residence Inn Charlotte City Center (formally known as 210 Trade and AC Hotel/Residence Inn Charlotte EpiCentre) is a  hotel highrise in Uptown Charlotte, North Carolina.

210 Trade
210 Trade began construction in 2007 on a planned residential tower atop the Queen City Quarter mixed used development. Once completed, 210 Trade would have had 52 floors and became the tallest residential building in Charlotte, surpassing The Vue, as well as the second-tallest building in Charlotte by total floor count, after the Bank of America Corporate Center. Construction stalled during the financial crisis of 2008 and the building sat unfinished until 2016.

Current status
In March 2016, construction resumed on the property and as of 2018, the 22 story tower has been completed. AC Hotels occupies 184 rooms and  Residence Inn occupies 116 rooms of the building.

See also
 List of tallest buildings in Charlotte
 Charlotte center city

References

External links
  Emporis

Skyscrapers in Charlotte, North Carolina
Hotel buildings completed in 2018